Helen Flanagan (born 7 August 1990) is an English actress. She is best known for playing the role of Rosie Webster in the ITV soap opera Coronation Street from 2000 to 2012; she reprised the role in 2017, before going on maternity leave on 8 June 2018.

Early life 
Flanagan was born in Bury, Greater Manchester, England. She attended Westholme School in Blackburn, Lancashire.

Career 
Flanagan first appeared as Rosie Webster in Coronation Street in January 2000. In 2006, she was nominated for the award of "Best Dramatic Performance from a Young Actor or Actress" at the British Soap Awards, losing to Ellis Hollins of Hollyoaks. In 2007, she was nominated for "Villain of the Year" at the same awards, this time losing to Coronation Street co-star Jack P. Shepherd. In 2010, Flanagan appeared in Coronation Street spin-off Coronation Street: A Knights Tale as her character Rosie Webster. In 2011, she had her own Coronation Street spin-off Just Rosie, which explored her character Rosie Webster trying to build a modelling career in London. Flanagan left Coronation Street in February 2012 to pursue other interests.

In November 2012, Flanagan participated in the twelfth series of I'm a Celebrity...Get Me Out of Here!, finishing in seventh place. In September 2013 she appeared in Celebrity Super Spa, a reality-television programme based in a Liverpool Salon on Channel 5. In January 2014, Flanagan starred in an episode of Celebrity Wedding Planner alongside Hugo Taylor on Channel 5. The following August she appeared as agency nurse Kirsty Brompton in an episode of Holby City. In October 2016, it was announced Flanagan would reprise her role as Rosie in Coronation Street in February 2017. She left on maternity leave in June 2018.

Personal life 
Flanagan's parents are Roman Catholic; she has expressed that she still feels a connection to her religious roots.

Flanagan became engaged to Preston North End winger Scott Sinclair on 31 May 2018. They have two daughters, and one son. In October 2022, the media reported that her relationship with Scott Sinclair had finished after 13 years.

Filmography

Awards and nominations

References

External links 

1990 births
20th-century English actresses
21st-century English actresses
Actresses from Greater Manchester
English child actresses
English female models
English film actresses
English Roman Catholics
English people of Irish descent
English soap opera actresses
English television actresses
English television personalities
English victims of crime
Living people
Page 3 girls
People educated at Westholme School
People from Bury, Greater Manchester
People from Prestbury, Cheshire
People with bipolar disorder
Association footballers' wives and girlfriends
I'm a Celebrity...Get Me Out of Here! (British TV series) participants